Paraíso Esporte Clube is a Brazilian football club based in Paraíso do Tocantins, Tocantins state. The club was formerly known as Intercap Esporte Clube until 2006 although they played the 2009 Campeonato Tocantinense as Intercap. They competed in the Série C once.

History
The club was founded on July 10, 1972. Intercap won the Campeonato Tocantinense in 1995, and competed in the Série C in the same year.

Achievements
Campeonato Tocantinense: 1
1995

Stadium
Paraíso Esporte Clube play their home games at Estádio José Pereira Rêgo, commonly known as Pereirão. The stadium has a maximum capacity of 2,300 people.

References

Football clubs in Tocantins
Association football clubs established in 1972
1972 establishments in Brazil